Eugene Washington (born November 23, 1944) is a former American football wide receiver in the National Football League. He played for the Minnesota Vikings (1967–1972) and the Denver Broncos (1973).

College career
A big 6'3", 208-lb receiver with great speed, he ran track as well as playing football for the Michigan State Spartans.  He was the 1965 NCAA Indoor Champion for 60-yard hurdles. He was inducted into the College Football Hall of Fame in 2011.

In 1964, he had 35 catches for 542 yards and five touchdowns (TDs).
In 1965, he had 44 catches for 719 yards and four TDs.
In 1966, he had 27 catches for 677 yards and seven TDs.

Professional career
He was drafted in the first round by the Minnesota Vikings in 1967 NFL draft, along with college teammate, running back Clinton Jones and future Pro Football Hall of Fame inductee Alan Page, a defensive end from the University of Notre Dame. As a rookie, Washington averaged 29.5 yards per reception. In 1968, he caught 46 passes.  In 1969, he had 821 receiving yards and 9 touchdowns.  Washington made the Pro Bowl in 1969 and 1970.  He played in Super Bowl IV (one catch for 9 yards) after the 1969 NFL season.  The Vikings were upset by the Kansas City Chiefs, 23-7, on January 11, 1970, at Tulane Stadium in New Orleans. He is the subject of the documentary, Through the Banks of the Red Cedar, written and directed by his daughter Maya Washington.

References

External links
NFL.com player page
Pro Football Reference player page 

1944 births
Living people
Players of American football from Houston
American football wide receivers
Michigan State Spartans football players
Minnesota Vikings players
Denver Broncos players
Western Conference Pro Bowl players
National Conference Pro Bowl players
College Football Hall of Fame inductees
People from La Porte, Texas